Peter J. Somers (April 12, 1850 – February 15, 1924) was an Irish-American mayor of Milwaukee, Wisconsin and member of the United States House of Representatives.

Biography
Somers was born in Menomonee Falls, Wisconsin on April 12, 1850. He grew up in the state of Wisconsin. He became a lawyer and moved to Milwaukee, where he soon became involved in politics. Somers served as city attorney for Milwaukee. In 1890, he was elected to the Milwaukee Common Council and served as president of the Milwaukee Common Council.

He served as mayor of Milwaukee from December 6, 1890, to June 5, 1893, when he resigned, having won an election to fill a vacancy in the United States House of Representatives caused by the resignation of John L. Mitchell who was elected to the U.S. Senate. Somers took over as the representative of Wisconsin's 4th congressional district in the 53rd United States Congress. Somers, a lifelong member of the Democratic Party, was not renominated for a full term in 1894, and left Congress when his term expired in 1895. He is to date the last mayor of Milwaukee elected to higher office.

He continued practicing law in Milwaukee until 1905, when he moved to Reno, Nevada. He became a lawyer, judge for Esmeralda County, Nevada, and served for a time as chairman of the Nevada Democratic State Central Committee.

He died at his home in Los Angeles, California on February 15, 1924. Somers was buried at Calvary Cemetery in Los Angeles.

References

External links

Nevada state court judges
Milwaukee Common Council members
Mayors of Milwaukee
American people of Irish descent
People from Esmeralda County, Nevada
1850 births
1924 deaths
Nevada Democrats
People from Menomonee Falls, Wisconsin
Democratic Party members of the United States House of Representatives from Wisconsin
Politicians from Reno, Nevada
Burials at Calvary Cemetery (Los Angeles)